Gerald VI, (1235–1285), was Viscount Fezensaguet from 1240 to 1285, then Count of Armagnac and Fezensac from 1256 to 1285. He was the son of Roger d'Armagnac, Viscount of Fezensaguet, and Pincelle d'Albret.

Life 
In 1249 he contested the possession of Armagnac and Fézensac which led to war with Arnaud Odon, Viscount Lomagne and Auvillars, husband of Mascarós I of Armagnac, heir to the counties of Armagnac and Fezensac and father of Mascarós Lomagne II. In this war Gerald was supported by his overlord, Count Raymond VII of Toulouse. Captured, he was released for ransom and continued the fight successfully. During his captivity, his mother, Pincelle d'Albret, presented in his name the county of Fezensaguet as tribute to Alphonse of Poitiers, the successor of Raymond VII, in return for continued support. It was not until 1255 that Gaston, Viscount of Bearn, managed to reconcile the adversaries.

In 1256, after the death of the childless Mascarós II Lomagne, Gerald, being her closest relative, inherited the counties of Armagnac and Fezensac. Following numerous quarrels with the Seneschal of Languedoc, he was captured and imprisoned two years in the castle of Peronne. Liberated, he paid homage to Edward I, King of England.

Marriage and children
In 1260, he married Mathe de Béarn (1250 † ap.1317), daughter of Gaston VII, Viscount of Béarn and Martha, Viscountess of Marsan

They had six children:
 Bernard VI (v.1270 † 1319), Count of Armagnac and Fezensac
 Gaston d'Armagnac (v.1275 † 1320), stem from the branch of the Viscounts of Fezensaguet
 Roger d'Armagnac († 1339), Archbishop of Auch, Bishop of Laon and Lavaur
 Mascarós Armagnac (v.1285 †), wife of William Arnaud Fumel (v.1280 †), Vicomte de Labarthe and Aure
 Alarcon Armagnac (v.1285 † 1313), married Bernard VIII (v.1285 † 1336), Count of Comminges
 Mathe d'Armagnac (v.1285 † 1313), married Bernard Trenqueléon Lomagne (v.1280 † 1337), Lord of Fimarcon.

Notes

References
 Bulletin de la Section de géographie, Vol.15, Ed. Ernest Leroux, Imprimerie Nationale, 1900.
 Revue de gascogne, Vol.21, Ed. Société historique de Gascogne, Imprimerie et Lithographie Felix Foix, 1880.

1235 births
1285 deaths
Counts of Armagnac